Castle Connolly Medical is a publishing organization dealing with healthcare research and information services in the US. The organization publishes an annual list of top doctors in the United States based on different quality aspects. The publisher is also known for its consumer guide pieces.  

John K Castle and John J Connolly while being the Chairman and President respectively of the board of trustees of the New York Medical College, founded Castle Connolly Medical in 1991. Castle Connolly Graduate Medical, a separate organization that publishes books and guidebooks, was established in 1999. A sister organization was established in 2006 with the name Castle Connolly Healthcare Navigation, to provide guidance in health and insurance. The sister organization was later merged with Castle Connolly Medical. Everyday Health Group acquired the organization in 2019.

The publisher works in collaboration with different news media and journal publication houses.

Selected publications 

 Top Doctors: New York Metro Area. United States: Castle Connolly Medical Limited, 2014. ISBN 9781883769345
 America's Top Doctors: America's Trusted Source for Identifying Top Doctors. United States: Castle Connolly Medical, 2011. ISBN 9780984567010
 Top Doctors: Chicago Metro Area. United States: Castle Connolly Medical Limited, 2002. ISBN 9781883769307
 Castle Connolly America's Top Doctors: A Castle Connolly Guide. United States: Castle Connolly Medical Limited, 2012. ISBN 9781883769628 
 Connolly, John J.., Morgan, Jean. Castle Connolly America's Top Doctors: America's Trusted Source for Identifying Top Doctors, The Best in American Medicine. United States: Castle Connolly Medical Limited, 2012. ISBN 9781883769635

References 

American companies established in 1991
Medical education
Clinical research
Medical and health organizations based in the United States